Mariusz Fyrstenberg and Marcin Matkowski were the defending champions, but lost in the first round.

Seeds

Draw

Draw

References
 Main Draw

Orange Prokom Open - Doubles